Bomannsvik is a village in Akershus, Norway, situated at the shore of Bunnefjorden in the municipality of Nesodden.

Villages in Akershus